Plummer Peak is a summit located in Mount Rainier National Park in Lewis County, Washington. With an elevation of  it is the seventh highest peak in the Tatoosh Range. It was named for Fred G. Plummer, a Forest Service cartographer who taught geography in Tacoma Public Schools.

Hiking to the summit requires a mix of hillwalking and scrambling. The area is also used for skiing, though avalanches present a danger; in 1988, skier Pamela Benton Lee died after being buried by an avalanche on Plummer Peak.

From the peak, views of Mount Rainier, the town of Packwood, the Goat Rocks, Mount St. Helens, and Mount Adams are visible. A small tarn is located on the side of the summit. A col called "The Saddle" creates a walkable ridge connecting Plummer Peak to its neighbor, Pinnacle Peak.

Gallery

References

Mountains of Lewis County, Washington
Mountains of Washington (state)
Mount Rainier National Park